Home to You is the sixth studio album by the American country music artist John Michael Montgomery, released in 1999. It includes the singles "Hello L.O.V.E.", "Home to You", "You Are", and "Nothing Catches Jesus By Surprise". "Hello L.O.V.E." reached #15 on the Billboard country charts and the title track peaked at #2. The  latter two singles both failed to make Top 40, thus becoming the first singles of Montgomery's career to miss Top 40. It was also the first album of Montgomery's career not to receive an RIAA certification.

"You Are" was later released by Chad Brock in 2004.

Track listing

Personnel
Adapted from liner notes

Sam Bacco - percussion (tracks 2–4, 6, 10)
Wendy Buckner - background vocals (track 1)
Sam Bush - mandolin (track 8)
Jerry Douglas - dobro (track 9)
Larry Franklin - fiddle (all tracks except 4 & 5)
Paul Franklin - electric slide guitar (tracks 1, 10), steel guitar (all tracks except 1 & 10)
Garth Fundis - background vocals (tracks 3, 10)
Rebecca Lynn Howard - background vocals (track 9)
Liana Manis - background vocals (track 6)
Larry Marrs - background vocals (track 2)
Brent Mason - electric guitar (all tracks)
John Michael Montgomery - lead vocals (all tracks), background vocals (track 10)
Greg Morrow - drums (all tracks)
Steve Nathan - keyboards (tracks 3, 10), organ (tracks 4, 6), piano (all tracks except 4)
Dave Pomeroy - bass guitar (tracks 2, 6, 9)
John Wesley Ryles - background vocals (tracks 4, 6, 8)
Darrell Scott - acoustic guitar (all tracks except 5 & 7), mandolin (track 5), background vocals (track 4)
Jason Sellers - background vocals (tracks 1, 7)
Keith Sewell - background vocals (track 1)
Biff Watson - acoustic guitar (tracks 5, 7)
Dennis Wilson - background vocals (track 5)
Glenn Worf - bass guitar (tracks 1, 3–5, 7, 8, 10)
Curtis "Mr. Harmony" Young - background vocals (tracks 3, 5)

Chart performance

Weekly charts

Year-end charts

References

1999 albums
Atlantic Records albums
John Michael Montgomery albums
Albums produced by Garth Fundis